Walter Raymond Kichefski (June 17, 1916 – January 9, 1992) was an American football player and coach. He played professionally in the National Football League (NFL) with the Pittsburgh Steelers, from 1940 to 1942, and again in 1944 with "Card-Pitt", a team that was the result of a temporary merger between the Chicago Cardinals and the Steelers. The merger was result of the manning shortages experienced league-wide due to World War II. He also served in the military during the war. His name is included on the NFL honor roll, which lists over 1,000 NFL personnel who served in the military during World War II. 

Kichefski played college football at the University of Miami. He served as interim head coach there for the final nine games of the 1970 season, following Charlie Tate's resignation, guiding the team to a 2–7 record. He began his Miami coaching career in 1943 as line mentor. After playing the 1944 season with "Card-Pitt", Walt rejoined the Hurricanes and the team went on to win the 1946 Orange Bowl. Kichefski was later recognized by the school with the title "The Gator Hater", which was aimed at the rival University of Florida. During his time at Miami, Kichefski mentored All-Americans Ted Hendricks, Bill Miller and Ed Weisacosky. He was inducted into the University of Miami Sports Hall of Fame in 1969.

Death and legacy
Kichefski died on January 9, 1992, at his home in South Miami, Florida.

The Walter Kichefski Football Award, named after Kichefski, is presented annually to the top scholar-athlete in the Miami football program. The Walter Kichefski Endowed Football Scholarship was created in 1992, in memory Kichefski. $400,000 was initially raised to endow the scholarship, the only undergraduate award presented by the University of Miami Sports Hall of Fame. The scholarship recipient is chosen each year by the football coaches, with the award going to the player who most embodies the characteristics by which Kichefski lived.

Head coaching record

References

External links
 

1916 births
1992 deaths
American football ends
Card-Pitt players
Miami Hurricanes football coaches
Miami Hurricanes football players
Pittsburgh Steelers players
People from Rhinelander, Wisconsin
Coaches of American football from Wisconsin
Players of American football from Wisconsin